or SF, meaning State Enterprise is a type of company in Norway. SFs are wholly owned by the Government of Norway, but it does not hold limited liability in the company. The government is free to convert any  (limited company) that it owns, or any other assets, to an SF, without approval by other parties.

The companies do have a board of directors and a managing director. The board must have at least three members; five if there is employee representation. The managing director can not sit on the board. All SFs must have an auditor.

History
The SF was created by the State Enterprise Act of August 30, 1991 (#71). Initially there were few SFs, but gradually there were created more, mainly by converting government agencies to SFs. During the 2000s the Conservative/Christian Democrat/Liberal government converted some of the SFs to limited companies, including Statkraft (the state power company).

Some s:
 Gassnova
 Enova SF
 SIVA SF
 Statnett SF
 Statskog SF
 Bane NOR SF

References
State Enterprise Act (Lov om statsforetak) of August 30, 1991 #71

Types of companies of Norway